The statuette of hoplite found at Dodona (Berlin antiquities collection, Misc. 7470, Antikensammlung der Staatlichen Museen zu Berlin, Misc. 7470) is an archaeological find which was purchased in 1880 and is hosted today in Berlin at the Altes Museum

Description
On a thin, elongated base stands a warrior in an offensive stance, armed with helmet, chest armour and greaves. In the left he is holding a Boeotian shield, while with his right he is brandishing a spear. The spear is lost, but the hole in the hand determines the original direction. The whole performance is vibrant and lively. The look of the bearded warrior above the shield is targeting an enemy. The muscles of the body are excellently curved and his posture shows that he is ready for a direct attack. The warrior wears a tunic through the chest resulting in triangled tuck. The rest of the body is naked, and he does not wear sandals. On his right cheek appears a thick tress peeping from inside the helmet, and reaching down to his chest.

This bronze, which was a statuette at the edge of a boiler, originating at the late sixth century BC (near 500 BC), shows significant differences from earlier similar statuettes and is characterized as a masterpiece, showing the transformation from the previously used  bound step position to the free striding, characterizing a new generation of sculptors

Further reading
There are several sources for further reading on this bronze hoplite statuette found in Dodona:
Kekulé (1909):  Bronzen aus Dodona in den koniglichen museen zu Berlin : herausgegeben von Reinhard Kekulé von Stradonitz und Hermann Winnefeld, (Berlin 1909)
K. A. Neugebauer (de-Wiki) (1923): Griechische Bronzen. (Meisterwerke in Berlin.) Berlin, 1923, p. 408f
K.A. Neugebauer, Staatliche Museen zu Berlin. Katalog der statuarischen Bronzen im Antiquarium I. Die minoischen und Archaisch Griechischen Bronzen (1931), Nr. 181 Taf. 29
K. A. Neugebauer (1951): Die griechischen Bronzen der klassischen Zeit und des Hellenismus, (Staatliche Museen zu Berlin. Katalog der statuarischen Bronzen im Antiquarium, Vol. II.) K. A. Neugebauer, edited by Carl Bluemel, Berlin, Akademie-Verlag (1951), 56ff, Nr. 46, Taf. 25
Parke (1967): Herbert William Parke, The Oracles of Zeus. Dodona, Olympia, Ammon (Oxford 1967), 275, Nr. 9
Fuehrer (1968): U. Gehrig - A. Greifenhagen - N. Kunisch, Führer durch die Antikenabteilung Berlin 1968, 152
Ιουλία Βοκοτοπούλου (Julia Vokotopoulou) (1975): Χαλκαί Κορινθιουργείς Πρόχοι, συμβολή εις την μελέτην της αρχαίας ελληνικής χαλκουργίας, Βιβλιοθήκη της εν Αθήναις Αρχαιολογικής Εταιρείας; τ. 82, Αρχαιολογική εταιρεία, ISSN 1105-7785,(1975), 157. Abb. 1.
Antikenmuseum Berlin: die ausgestellten Werke, Wolf-Dieter Heilmeyer; Luca Giuliani; Gertrud Platz-Horster; Gerhard Zimmer; Berlin : Staatliche Museen Preussischer Kulturbesitz, 1988, 75, Nr.7
Thomas 1992: Griechische Bronzestatuetten, Renate Thomas, Darmstadt, 1992, 71f, Abb.57
Die Antikensammlung: Altes Museum Pergamonmuseum, Staatliche Museen zu Berlin—Preussischer Kulturbesitz. Antikensammlung, Editors Brigitte Knittlmayer, Wolf-Dieter Heilmeyer, Ed. 2,  Ph. von Zabern, 1998, 9783805324496, 17 Nr. 6
Ziegenbock aus Dodona, Berlin-Charlottenburg 10584

References

6th-century BC Greek sculptures
Ancient Epirus
Ancient Greek bronze statues of the classical period
Altes Museum
Ancient Greek military art
Classical sculptures of the Berlin State Museums